Yann Songo'o (born 19 November 1991) is a professional footballer who plays as a defender for Walsall, on loan from Bradford City. Born in France, he has represented Cameroon at youth level.

Club career

Early years
Songo'o began his career in Spain, playing in Deportivo's youth categories. He then had a short period in the French club FC Metz, and in 2009 he was moved to Spain, playing for Real Zaragoza's youth ranks. After one season with Zaragoza B, he was moved to freshly-promoted CE Sabadell FC.

On 31 January 2012, Songo'o rescinded his contract with Sabadell, and in the same day he signed a contract with CF Pobla de Mafumet.

United States
On 13 December 2012, Songo'o signed with Major League Soccer club Sporting Kansas City. He was loaned to third-division Orlando City for the 2013 season.

Songo'o scored one goal in twelve appearances with Orlando City before mutually agreeing to terminate his contract with Sporting Kansas City in June 2013, effectively ending his loan as well.

Blackburn Rovers
In July 2013, Songo'o featured in a pre-season friendly for the English Championship side Blackburn Rovers F.C., as part of a trial period with the club, he featured in two pre-season friendlies. On 5 August 2013, Songo'o signed a two-year deal with the club on a free transfer. He made his senior debut for the club on 7 August 2013 in a Football League Cup match against Carlisle United. Songo'o started the match and played the full 90 minutes of the 3–4 defeat in extra time.

Ross County (loan)
On 18 January 2014, Songo'o signed for Ross County of the Scottish Premiership on loan until the end of the 2013–14 season on 30 June 2014. He was then placed directly into the starting line-up for Ross County's match against Dundee United. Songo'o made his debut for the club in the starting XI for that match the same day that the signing was confirmed. During Ross County's next match only seven days later, Songo'o scored his first goal for the club during a 1–2 defeat to Hearts on 25 January 2014.

Plymouth Argyle
Songo'o joined EFL League Two side Plymouth Argyle on 19 June 2016, reuniting with Derek Adams who was his manager at Ross County. He scored his first goal for the club on 15 October 2016 in a 2–2 draw at home to Portsmouth. His second goal for the club came in a 3–3 draw with Wycombe Wanderers at home on 26 December 2016. Argyle won promotion to the EFL League One that season.

He signed a new contract with Argyle at the end of the 2017–18 season. He was offered a new contract by Plymouth Argyle at the end of the 2018–19 season but instead decided to join newly-relegated League Two side Scunthorpe United on a one-year deal.

Morecambe
On 23 September 2020, Songo'o joined EFL League Two side Morecambe. On 18 March 2021, he was handed a six-game ban and ordered to complete face-to-face education after admitting a charge of directing a homophobic insult at an opposing player.

Bradford City
He moved to Bradford City at the start of the 2021–22 season.

In January 2023 he moved on loan to Walsall.

Personal life
The Songo'o family has raised many footballers. Yann is the son of former Cameroonian national team goalkeeper Jacques Songo'o, who featured for Spanish side Deportivo La Coruña in the late 1990s and early 2000s. His brother is a professional footballer Franck Songo'o.

Career statistics

Honours

Morecambe
EFL League Two play-offs: 2021

References

External links
 Sabadell official profile
 Futbolme profile
 

1991 births
Living people
Footballers from Yaoundé
French sportspeople of Cameroonian descent
Citizens of Cameroon through descent
Cameroonian footballers
French footballers
Association football defenders
Real Zaragoza B players
CE Sabadell FC footballers
CF Pobla de Mafumet footballers
Sporting Kansas City players
Orlando City SC (2010–2014) players
Blackburn Rovers F.C. players
Ross County F.C. players
Morecambe F.C. players
Cameroonian expatriate footballers
Expatriate footballers in Spain
Expatriate soccer players in the United States
Expatriate footballers in England
Expatriate footballers in Scotland
Segunda División players
USL Championship players
Scottish Professional Football League players
France youth international footballers
Cameroon under-20 international footballers
Sportspeople from Toulon
Cameroonian expatriate sportspeople in Spain
Cameroonian expatriate sportspeople in the United States
Cameroonian expatriate sportspeople in England
Cameroonian expatriate sportspeople in Scotland
Bradford City A.F.C. players
Footballers from Provence-Alpes-Côte d'Azur
Walsall F.C. players